Dow's Lake in Ottawa, Ontario, Canada is a small man-made lake on the Rideau Canal, situated two kilometres north of Hog's Back Falls in the middle of Ottawa. It is at the south end of Preston Street, just south of Carling Avenue, and just to the west of Bronson Avenue. At the south end of the lake is Carleton University, and to the west is the Dominion Arboretum, at the edge of the Central Experimental Farm.

History

Early settlement 

The lake is named after Abram Dow, an American-born settler who came to Ontario in the early 19th Century and who owned land in this area in 1816. Before the construction of the canal, this area was known as Dow's Great Swamp. The lake was created when a dam was constructed along the north shore (Queen Elizabeth Driveway is now atop the dam) to allow flooding for the canal. Originally, the Rideau Canal was to run north from Dow's Lake, but land speculation and Colonel By's reluctance to reward such speculation resulted in the current location of the canal.

20th-century developments 

In past years, the parkland to the north and east was rail yards until the 1940s and the area was mostly industrial.
Situated next to the pavilion on the western shore is Canadian Forces Reserve Barrack Dow's Lake. This installation, opened in 1943, is home to HMCS Carleton a unit of the Canadian Naval Reserve.

A rail tunnel, which was formerly owned and operated by Canadian Pacific, passes under the lake.  This tunnel replaced a rail line that once crossed the lake on the surface.  The OC Transpo introduced the O-Train (today's Trillium Line) in 2001, a light-rail transit system, which remains the primary user of the tunnel.
 
It commemorates the role Canadian forces played in the liberation of the Netherlands, and a reproduced cast of the sculpture exists as the National Canadian Liberation Monument in Apeldoorn, Netherlands. Facing to the lake, it symbolises the historic links between Canada and the Netherlands as well as Princess Margriet's birth at the Ottawa Civic Hospital.

Visitor activities

In May, the surrounding park, Commissioners Park, displays tulips planted by the NCC (National Capital Commission) for the annual Canadian Tulip Festival. Over 50 varieties and approximately 300,000 tulips  bloom each May along the Rideau Canal.

During the winter, Dow's Lake freezes and becomes part of the world's longest skating rink and one of the primary sites of the Winterlude festival in February, with events such as the 'bed races' and 'waiter races' on the ice.

Two scenic drives along the canal pass to either side of the lake. The Queen Elizabeth Driveway, named after the late Queen Elizabeth the Queen Mother (who traveled along it during the 1939 royal visit) runs beside the north and west sides of the lake. The Colonel By Drive, named after the founder of the city, Lieutenant-Colonel John By, runs beside the south side of the lake.

At the north end of the lake a pavilion is situated over the water with three restaurants overlooking the water. They are Umbrella Bar, Lago and Mexi's. Other services of the pavilion include canoe, kayak and paddle boat rentals, boat mooring and an indoor change area for skating. It is open year-round.

Notes

References 

 Woods, Shirley E. Jr. Ottawa: The Capital of Canada, Toronto: Doubleday Canada, 1980.

External links 

 Dows Lake Pavilion Privately run Dows Lake Pavilion

Landforms of Ottawa
Parks in Ottawa
Lakes of Ontario
Rideau Canal